The table below lists the independent aircraft Flights of the Royal Flying Corps and Royal Air Force which were given Alphabetical designations.

Flights

See also

References

Citations

Bibliography

External links